The R670 road is a regional road in Ireland. The route runs from its junction with the R639 and N24 at Cloughabreeda 2 km north of Cahir through Cahir town and onwards for a further 8 km to Ardfinnan, where it joins the R665 road. The R670 is located entirely in County Tipperary.

The section of the R670 from Cloughabreeda to Cahir town centre was the main road connecting Cahir with Cashel in 1714 and was part of the T9 prior to 1974, when it was renumbered as part of the Dublin-Cork N8 national primary route. When the N8 was realigned to run southwest of Cahir in 1990, the old section of the road was reclassified as a regional road, and incorporated into the existing R670.

See also
Roads in Ireland
National primary road
History of roads in Ireland
Trunk Roads in Ireland

References

Roads Act 1993 (Classification of Regional Roads) Order 2006 – Department of Transport

Regional roads in the Republic of Ireland
Roads in County Tipperary